Viktor Zapara (born 6 April 1972) is a Ukrainian former professional footballer who played as a defender.

Career
Zapara began his career at Niva-Borisfen Mironovka in 1992. He spent the majority of his peripatetic career moving between a handful of teams in the Ukrainian lower divisions, most notably Fakel Varva.

After retirement
After the end of his football career he became the manager of Rosava-Nasha Ryaba.

Honours
Niva-Borisfen Mironovka
 Ukrainian First League Runner up:1994–95

References

External links
 Viktor Zapara at upl.ua 

1972 births
Living people
Footballers from Chernihiv
NK Veres Rivne players
FC Desna Chernihiv players
FC Fakel Varva players FC Krasyliv
FC Krasyliv players 
Ukrainian footballers
Association football central defenders
Ukrainian First League players